Tom Bryant may refer to:

 Tommy Bryant (1930–1982), American jazz double-bassist
 Tom Bryant (harpist) (1882–1946), Welsh harpist

See also
 Thomas Bryant (disambiguation)